Lily Perdida is the third studio album by Clue to Kalo. It was released through Mush Records on 20 January 2009. The album tells the story of the title character from the perspective of those around her.

Production
Clue to Kalo's Mark Mitchell says of the album's concept:

Critical reception

At Metacritic, which assigns a weighted average score out of 100 to reviews from mainstream critics, the album received an average score of 72, based on 4 reviews, indicating "generally favorable reviews".

Alan Ranta of PopMatters gave the album 7 stars out of 10, stating, "It is [Mark] Mitchell's most organic fusion yet, dripping with indie psychedelia through delicate melodies of acoustic guitar, harpsichord, flute, and anything under the stairs he could squeeze through his soundcard." He added, "It's as impressive as it is warm and charming." Ian Gormely of Exclaim! commented that "this cycle of heavy-hearted pop tunes is spiritually reminiscent of '60s concept records like Pet Sounds and Odyssey and Oracle — fun and heartbreaking all at once." Dominic Umile of XLR8R wrote, "This is a dense, challenging ride, where the search for the big hooks is sometimes derailed by an onslaught of smaller ones."

Track listing

Personnel
Credits adapted from liner notes.

 Mark Mitchell – music
 Ellen Carey – additional music
 Curtis Leaver – additional music
 Vic Conrad – additional music
 Cornel Wilczek – additional music
 Martin Butler – additional music
 Emilie Flierl – additional music
 Alan Beverley – additional music

References

External links
 

2009 albums
Mush Records albums
Pop albums by Australian artists